Benito Juárez is an outdoor bronze sculpture depicting Mexican lawyer and politician Benito Juárez created by Mexican sculptor Ernesto Tamariz, installed at San Diego's Pantoja Park, in the U.S. state of California. The statue was gifted by the Mexican government in the 1980s.

See also

 Benito Juárez (Martinez), installed in Chicago and Houston
 Statue of Benito Juárez (New York City)

References

External links
 

Bronze sculptures in California
Monuments and memorials in California
Outdoor sculptures in San Diego
Sculptures of men in California
Statues in California
San Diego